Tanja Tzarovska (born 19 March 1980 in Resen, North Macedonia) is a Macedonian singer, songwriter, and composer.

Style
Her style is described as belonging to the Balkan and Byzantine harmonic genres, and her vocals have been described as "angelic". In her song-writing Tanja often combines Macedonian traditional melodies with her original contemporary English lyrics.

Career
She has completed No Record of Wrong, her first album of original songs and covers, in 2010. She performed a duet with Josh Groban for Wolfgang Petersen's Troy and was also the featured vocalist in John Debney's score for Mel Gibson's The Passion of the Christ. She appeared in 1 Giant Leap, a music/philosophy documentary film by Jamie Catto and Duncan Bridgeman, as well as Milcho Manchevski's latest film Mothers and the computer game Fable III.

References

Living people
21st-century Macedonian women singers
People from Resen, North Macedonia
Macedonian emigrants to the United Kingdom
British people of Macedonian descent
1980 births